Riverdale School District may refer to:
 Riverdale School District (New Jersey) in New Jersey
 Riverdale School District (Wisconsin) in Wisconsin